Gary Felipe Tello Mery (born 11 April 1993) is a Chilean footballer who currently plays for Unión Bellavista.

Career

References

External links
 Gary Tello at Football-Lineups
 

1993 births
Living people
People from La Serena
Chilean footballers
Chilean Primera División players
Segunda División Profesional de Chile players
Primera B de Chile players
Deportes La Serena footballers
Deportes Melipilla footballers
Deportes Magallanes footballers
Magallanes footballers
Curicó Unido footballers
Unión Española footballers
C.D. Antofagasta footballers
Rangers de Talca footballers
Association football forwards
Association football fullbacks